Mathías Saavedra Perdomo (born April 30, 1989) is an Uruguayan footballer who plays as a forward.

Saavedra began his career in 2010 with Nacional. Since then, he has played for many different teams in Uruguay, Spain and Argentina.

References

1989 births
Living people
Uruguayan footballers
Uruguayan expatriate footballers
Association football forwards
Uruguayan Primera División players
Primera B Metropolitana players
Paraguayan Primera División players
Segunda División B players
Boca Juniors footballers
Club Atlético River Plate (Montevideo) players
Club Nacional de Football players
Danubio F.C. players
Montevideo City Torque players
RSD Alcalá players
Huracán F.C. players
El Tanque Sisley players
Sud América players
Recreativo de Huelva players
Rampla Juniors players
CD San Roque de Lepe footballers
CSyD Tristán Suárez footballers
12 de Octubre Football Club players
Uruguayan expatriate sportspeople in Argentina
Uruguayan expatriate sportspeople in Spain
Uruguayan expatriate sportspeople in Paraguay
Expatriate footballers in Argentina
Expatriate footballers in Spain
Expatriate footballers in Paraguay